El usurpador is a Mexican telenovela produced by Televisa for Telesistema Mexicano in 1967.

Cast 
Jorge Lavat as Octavio "El usurpador"
Magda Guzmán as  María
Raúl Dantés
Magda Guzmán
Noé Murayama
Gloria Leticia Ortiz
Raúl "Chato" Padilla
Adriana Roel

References

External links 

Mexican telenovelas
1967 telenovelas
Televisa telenovelas
Spanish-language telenovelas
1967 Mexican television series debuts
1967 Mexican television series endings